Stanković is a village in Croatia. It is connected by the D414 highway.

Populated places in Dubrovnik-Neretva County